Jamal Sharif Anderson (born September 30, 1972) is an American former professional football player who was a running back for the Atlanta Falcons of the National Football League (NFL). He was drafted by the Falcons in the seventh round of the 1994 NFL Draft. He played high school football at El Camino Real High School, where he was named to the CIF Los Angeles City Section 4-A All-City first-team in 1989.  He went on to play college football at Moorpark College for the Moorpark College Raiders before playing at Utah.

Anderson earned a Pro Bowl selection in 1998, leading the NFC in rushing and helping the Falcons to an appearance in Super Bowl XXXIII. He suffered a career-ending knee injury in 2001 while finishing his eight-year career with 41 touchdowns and nearly 7,000 yards of offense.

Professional career

Atlanta Falcons
Anderson played eight seasons with the Falcons, amassing 5,336 rushing yards, 156 receptions for 1,645 yards, and 41 touchdowns before he suffered what became a career-ending tear of his ACL in 2001.

He was well known for his "Dirty Bird" touchdown celebration, in which he flapped his arms as if they were wings and rhythmically bouncing side to side. The dance has been widely copied; in a press conference Anderson stated, “people break out and do the Dirty Bird in the strangest places.”

NFL statistics
Rushing Stats

Receiving Stats

Sports broadcasting career
Anderson appeared as an analyst on ESPN/ABC, often promoting his alma mater the University of Utah, and the Mountain West Conference.  He is a big proponent of the BCS non-AQ conference schools gaining more access to the same opportunities as BCS AQ conference schools.

From mid-August to late-October 2009, Anderson appeared as a regular phone-in guest on "Morency" on Hardcore Sports Radio (HSR) to recap/discuss the week that was and the week that was coming up in the NFL with Gabriel Morency and Cam Stewart. After two-week period from late-October to early-November 2009, where HSR dropped Morency (the person and the show) from their programming line-up, Anderson returned as a regular weekly guest again on HSR's replacement show "Red Heat" hosted by Cam Stewart.

In October 2010, Anderson began appearing as an analyst for CNN Newsroom, providing insight on current NFL issues as well as news and highlights from the major sports leagues.

Personal life
Anderson was arrested in February 2009 on suspicion of cocaine possession. Atlanta police said that Anderson and another man were snorting cocaine off the toilet bowl in the restroom of the Peachtree Tavern nightclub.

Anderson was arrested for DUI on June 24, 2012. He was arrested in DeKalb county, just northeast of Atlanta.

Anderson was banned from a QuikTrip store in Suwanee, Georgia on December 14, 2016 after allegedly exposing himself and appearing intoxicated. He was not arrested, but was issued a warning for criminal trespass, effectively a warning that he will be arrested if he returns to that QuikTrip location.

Anderson was arrested on December 23, 2018, after refusing to pay his limo driver $50. He was arrested by Gwinnett County Police where he was released on $213 bail. The limo driver did not press charges. Anderson was intoxicated.

He resides in Braselton, Georgia.

References

1972 births
Living people
People from Woodland Hills, Los Angeles
Sportspeople from East Orange, New Jersey
Players of American football from Atlanta
American football running backs
Moorpark Raiders football players
Utah Utes football players
Atlanta Falcons players
National Conference Pro Bowl players
College football announcers
Players of American football from Los Angeles
El Camino Real High School alumni
Ed Block Courage Award recipients